Pölla is a municipality in the district of Zwettl in the Austrian state of Lower Austria.

Geography
It is situated roughly in the center of the northwestern region of the Austrian state called Waldviertel. About 46 per cent of the municipality is forested.

Subdivision
The municipality of Pölla consists of: 
 Altpölla 
 Döllersheim
 Felsenberg 
 Franzen 
 Kienberg 
 Kleinenzersdorf 
 Kleinraabs 
 Krug 
 Neupölla (municipal seat) 
 Nondorf 
 Ramsau 
 Reichhalms 
 Riegers 
 Schmerbach am Kamp 
 Thaures 
 Waldreichs 
 Wegscheid am Kamp 
 Wetzlas

Population

References

External links

Cities and towns in Zwettl District